Yang Hong may refer to:

 Yang Hong (scholar) (陽鴻), Eastern Han dynasty scholar
 Yang Hong (楊弘), an official serving under the Eastern Han dynasty warlord Yuan Shu
 Yang Hong (Shu Han) (楊洪), official of the Shu Han state in the Three Kingdoms period
 Yang Hong (rower) (born 1971), Chinese Olympic rower